Come Undone is a 2010 film directed by Italian director Silvio Soldini.

Plot
Anna (Alba Rohrwacher) works at an insurance company and is married to Alessio (Giuseppe Battiston) who wants to have a baby. She then happens to meet Domenico (Pierfrancesco Favino), headwaiter at a local restaurant. The two start a passionate relationship, but their personal lives get in the way. And they won't happy each other.

Cast
 Alba Rohrwacher as Anna
 Pierfrancesco Favino as Domenico
 Giuseppe Battiston as Alessio, Anna's husband
 Teresa Saponangelo as Miriam, Domenico's wife
 Fabio Troiano as Bruno
 Tatiana Lepore as Bianca
 Adriana De Guilmi as Anna's mother
 Gigio Alberti as Anna's boss
 Ninni Bruschetta as Domenico's brother

Awards
 Cabourg Film Festival 2010: Grand Prix

External links
 
 
 

2010 films
Italian romantic drama films
2010s Italian-language films
Films set in Milan
Films directed by Silvio Soldini
2010s Italian films